These are the results of 2019 BWF World Senior Championships' 40+ events.

Men's singles

Seeds 
  Hosemari Fujimoto (silver medalist)
  Naruenart Chuaymak (quarterfinals)
  Oliver Colin (bronze medalist)
  Morten Eilby Rasmussen (quarterfinals)
  Thorsten Hukriede (gold medalist)
  Xavier Engrand (fourth round)
  Thomas Blondeau (quarterfinals)
  Björn Wippich (quarterfinals)
  Kazuhiro Nomura (fourth round)
  Lakhwinder Pannu (third round)
  Wayne Philogene (second round)
  Marcus Jansson (third round)
  Mark Mackay (third round)
  Toni Kemppinen (fourth round)
  Casper Lund (fourth round)
  Lars Klintrup (fourth round)

Finals

Top half

Section 1

Section 2

Section 3

Section 4

Bottom half

Section 5

Section 6

Section 7

Section 8

Women's singles

Seeds 
  Claudia Vogelgsang (gold medalist)
  Chandrika de Silva (silver medalist)
  Rebecca Pantaney (quarterfinals)
  Rie Matsumoto (bronze medalist)
  Maki Jin (third round)
  Stefanie Schmidt (quarterfinals)
  Monika Bieńkowska (third round)
  Katja Wengberg (quarterfinals)

Finals

Top half

Section 1

Section 2

Bottom half

Section 3

Section 4

Men's doubles

Seeds 
  Tihomir Kirov / Plamen Mihalev (third round)
  Christian Barthel / Alexander Schulz (second round)
  Esben B. Kæmpegaard / Morten Eilby Rasmussen (silver medalists)
  Hosemari Fujimoto / Masayuki Matsumoto (quarterfinals)
  Tetsushi Minaguchi / Kazuhiro Nomura (third round)
  Oliver Colin /  Konstantin Myakishev (withdrew)
  Johnny Hast Hansen / Kennet Herløv (second round)
  Lars Klintrup /  Mark Mackay (bronze medalists)

Finals

Top half

Section 1

Section 2

Bottom half

Section 3

Section 4

Women's doubles

Seeds 
  Rebecca Pantaney / Lynne Swan (quarterfinals)
  Chandrika de Silva /  Claudia Vogelgsang (bronze medalists)
  Maria Kurochkina /  Alina Mihaela Popa (third round)
  Nami Fukui / Rie Matsumoto (second round)
  Jou Yu-ling / Shü Yuh-ling (third round)
  Yoko Fujita / Mikiko Taniguchi (second round)
  Swati Tarun Chauhan / Pooja Mehta (third round)
  Petra Schlüter /  Pawarisa Wareechol (quarterfinals)

Finals

Top half

Section 1

Section 2

Bottom half

Section 3

Section 4

Mixed doubles

Seeds 
  Carl Jennings / Rebecca Pantaney (silver medalists)
  Hosemari Fujimoto / Rie Matsumoto (gold medalists)
  Thorsten Hukriede / Michaela Hukriede (bronze medalists)
  Konstantin Myakishev / Maria Kurochkina (withdrew)
  Samir Abbasi / Swati Tarun Chauhan (second round)
  Esben B. Kæmpegaard / Helle Kæmpegaard (first round)
  Mark Mackay /  Erla Björg Hafsteinsdóttir (quarterfinals)
  Björn Wippich / Jessica Willems (first round)

Finals

Top half

Section 1

Section 2

Bottom half

Section 3

Section 4

References 
Men's singles
Women's singles
Men's doubles
Women's doubles
Mixed doubles

2019 BWF World Senior Championships